Computer Animation Studio, Petersburg is a Saint Petersburg-based Russian studio which produces animated films.

Filmography
 Kikoriki (Smešariki) (Since 2004)                                                                                                                 
 Teeth, Tail and Ears (Зубы, хвост и уши) (Since 2010)
 Kikoriki. Team Invincible (Смешарики. Начало) (2011)
 Chinti (2011)
 Kikoriki. Legend of the Golden Dragon (2016)
 Kikoriki (2017)BabyRiki (2017-present)Kikoriki. De Ja Vu (2018)
 Finnick (2022)
 Kikoriki forever (Cancelled)
 Agent Chekhov'' (in production)

See also
History of Russian animation
List of animated feature films

External links

References 

Russian animation studios
Mass media companies established in 2003
Companies based in Saint Petersburg
Film production companies of Russia